Air Liquide is a German electronic band composed of Ingmar Koch (a.k.a. "Dr Walker") and Cem Oral (a.k.a. "Jammin' Unit") that was formed in Frankfurt in 1991. Koch and Oral continued to record together under the pseudonyms Madonna 303 and Jammin' Unit & Walker.

History 
Oral and Koch in 1991 met at a recording studio in Frankfurt. After a variety of jam sessions in Koch Studio, the duo released Neue Frankfurter Elektronik Schule. Lyrics and vocals for some songs was contributed by Koch's former girlfriend Mary Susan Applegate. Air Liquide was in the mid-1990s especially known for their live performances. The band broke up in 2005 after the previous year's album Let Your Ears Be the Receiver. The duo has continued to reunite and perform at various festivals since 2012.

Discography 
 Neue Frankfurter Elektronik Schule (1991)
 Liquid Air EP (1992)
 Air Liquide (1993)
 Mandragora (1993)
 Robot Wars (1994)
 Nephology (1994)
 If There Was No Gravity (1994)
 Space Brothers (1994)
 The Mercury EP
 The Increased Difficulty of Concentration (1994)
 Abuse Your Illusions (1995)
 Live in New York City 1994 (1995)
 Red (1995)
 Black (1995)
 Stroboplastics (1995)
 Sonic Weather Machine (1995)
 Homicidal Diary (1997)
 Uludag (1998)
 Reissued: Mandragora & Liquid Air  (1998)
 Anybody Home? (1999)
 Lo Rider (1999)
 X (2001)
 Music is a Virus (2002)
 Let Your Ears Be the Receiver (2004)
 This Is a Mind Trip (2019)

References

External links 
 
 Dr. Walker on Liquid-Sky-Berlin.com
 Offizielle Website JamminMasters.com
 Ehemalige Website der Jammin' Unit
 Dr Walker Interview on Amazona.de
 Air Liquide story in Thump / Vice Mag

German electronic music groups
Harvest Records artists
Musical groups established in 1991
1991 establishments in Germany